Governor Hyde may refer to:

Edward Hyde (Governor of North Carolina) (1667–1712), 1st governor of the Province of North Carolina in 1712
Edward Hyde, 3rd Earl of Clarendon (1661–1723), Governor of the Provinces of New Jersey and New York from 1702 to 1708